The Deputy Prime Minister of Romania, officially the Deputy Prime Minister of the Government of Romania, is a minister in the Government of Romania. It is considered a non-portfolio role.

List of deputy prime ministers (1932–1947)

List of first vice presidents of the Council of Ministers (1948–1989)

List of deputy prime ministers (1989–present)

See also 
 List of heads of government of Romania

References 

1980 establishments in Romania
Deputy prime ministers